Koombea INC is an American digital product development company, established in 2007. The company specializes in mobile and web applications based on the open-source tool Ruby on Rails. The firm has offices in San Francisco and New York City in the US and Barranquilla in Colombia, and is headquartered in Miami, Florida. It was founded by Jonathan Tarud, who currently acts as the CEO of the company.

The company has developed Software development tools for sales, team and marketing management. 
Among them is Saasler, a tool that focuses on native integration to enhance product sales and promote brand loyalty. The application also includes several integration intelligence features, such as refreshing expired tokens, API throttling, security and data encryption, and a range of analytic. Convergely is a virtual assistant developed by Koombea, which works through integration with chat apps, like Slack and HipChat. The company has also developed Dashable, an app which builds up on the concept of time tracking.

References

Software companies of Colombia
American companies established in 2007
Software companies established in 2007
Software companies based in Florida
Software companies of the United States